Pullinen is a Finnish surname. Notable people with the surname include:

Erkki Pullinen (1871–1934), Finnish farmer and politician
Laila Pullinen (1933–2015), Finnish artist and sculptor

See also
Pellinen

Finnish-language surnames